Bashkand (also Romanized as Bāshkand) is a village in Qaleh Darrehsi Rural District, in the Central District of Maku County, West Azerbaijan Province, Iran. At the 2006 census, its population was 403, in 90 families.

References 

Populated places in Maku County